KRES (104.7 FM) is a radio station broadcasting a classic country music format. Licensed to Moberly, Missouri, United States, the station serves the Columbia, Missouri, area.  The station is currently owned by Alpha Media, through licensee Alpha Media Licensee LLC, and features programming from ABC Radio.  The station began broadcasting on 1550 AM in St. Joseph, Missouri, in 1947, playing hits from the 1920s, 1930s, and 1940s.  The station changed its call sign to KKJO in 1962 and began playing hits from the 1950s and 1960s.

Today KRES broadcasts on 104.7 FM with a classic country music with spot news and agricultural news format.  KRES is the Moberly affiliate for St. Louis Cardinals baseball.

Throughout the day, the on-air programmers who can be heard on KRES include, Brad Boyer, Bill Peterson, J.B. Connoley, Dan Patterson, Adam Hildebrandt, and Kyle Hill.

In the late 1980s, on air staff included Jack Larkin, Jim Coyle, Bob Bagby, Dale Palmer, Ron Block, Larry Weller, Doug Owens and Rich Cain. In the early 1990s, KWIX-KRES radio's on-air staff included St. Louis-area transplants such as Bryan Polcyn, Doug Stewart, Mike Roberts and Paul Lewandowski.

Ownership
On March 1, 2007, it was announced that GoodRadio.TV LLC planned to buy The Shepherd Group of radio stations in Missouri.  The Shepherd Group operates 16 small-market radio stations in Missouri.  The deal was reportedly worth $30.6 million.

Dean Goodman recently formed the new company, GoodRadio.TV.  He is the former president and chief executive officer of the television broadcasting company ION Media Networks Inc.  Goodman stepped down from ION Media Networks in October 2006.

The Shepherd Group includes KJEL and KBNN in Lebanon; KJFF in Festus; KREI and KTJJ in Farmington; KRES-FM and KWIX in Moberly; KIRK in Macon; KIIK, KOZQ-FM, KJPW and KFBD-FM in Waynesville; KAAN-FM and KAAN in Bethany; and KMRN and KKWK in Cameron.

In December 2013, GoodRadio.TV merged into Digity, LLC. Effective February 25, 2016, Digity and its 124 radio stations were acquired by Alpha Media for $264 million.

References

External links

RES
Country radio stations in the United States
Radio stations established in 1962
Alpha Media radio stations